Pleasant Bay is a community on the western coast of Cape Breton Island, on the shore of the Gulf of St. Lawrence in Inverness County, Nova Scotia. The community is located on the Cabot Trail, 141 kilometers from Port Hawkesbury. The federal electoral riding is Sydney—Victoria. Pleasant Bay is known as the whale watching capital of Cape Breton and marks the center of the Cabot trail.

The main industry here is fishing, lobster in spring and snowcrab in the summer. The forest here is home to a variety of birds, fox, coyote, and snowshoe hare. The area is visited by whale watchers from all over the world.

Communications
The Postal Code is B0E 2P0
The Telephone exchange is 902-224

Demographics
Total Population 258
Total Dwellings 133
Total Land Area 636.628 km2

Climate

References

External links
Pleasant Bay Travel Guide, Cabot Trail Nova Scotia
 

Communities in Inverness County, Nova Scotia
General Service Areas in Nova Scotia